Loučka may refer to:

 Loučka (Olomouc District)
 Loučka (Vsetín District)
 Loučka (Zlín District)